The Shipping Corporation of New Zealand was a New Zealand shipping company created by the Third Labour Government led by Norman Kirk in 1973.

Background 
Norman Kirk advocated for the creation of a New Zealand-owned shipping line as leader of the Opposition, which was Labour's policy at the 1969 and 1972 elections. Kirk argued that "the New Zealand farmer has always been at the mercy of the overseas shipping companies." Upon election to office following the 1972 general election, Kirk moved quickly to establish the shipping line, appointing former Meat Board chairman John Ormond as chairman and Federation of Labour President Tom Skinner as his deputy. The Shaw Savill Line offered two vessels, the Laurentic and the MV Zealandic, for the shipping line.

Formation 
The Shipping Corporation of New Zealand Act 1973 established the corporation as a statutory corporation, which began trading in 1974. The New Zealand Government owned a majority of shares, while the Shaw Savill Line had a 30% stake in the shipping line.

The Shipping Corporation adopted a new trading name on 1 September 1985, New Zealand Line, to emphasis its international links.

State-owned enterprise 
From 1 April 1987 the Shipping Corporation became the Shipping Corporation of New Zealand Limited, along with other government-owned departments and corporations, became a State-owned enterprise, and was required to make a profit.

Privatisation 
In the 1987 budget, it was announced that the New Zealand Line would be sold.
The New Zealand Line was privatised in March 1989, being sold to Associated Container Transportation (ACT), trading as P&O for $33.5 million.

References and citations

Citations

References

External links 
 Australasian Legal Information Institute - Shipping Corporation of New Zealand
 New Zealand Merchant Service Guild - History

Defunct transport companies of New Zealand
Government-owned companies of New Zealand
Shipping companies of New Zealand
New Zealand companies established in 1974
Transport companies established in 1974